Fekišovce is a village and municipality in the Sobrance District in the Košice Region of east Slovakia.

History
In historical records the village was first mentioned in 1391.

Geography
The village lies at an altitude of 121 metres and covers an area of 4.758 km2.
It has a population of about 300 people.

Culture
The village has a public library.

Local Politics
Despite its small population, the village became well known in Slovakia after the inaugural municipal council meeting on 10 December 2018. During the meeting, the local mayor Miloslava Fedorová was very strict to her colleagues and treated them like incompetent children. The council meeting was seen by many third parties as chaotic and absurd; her interactions with her council members were highly antagonistic, with her forcing the council members to sing the national anthem, overriding their unanimous decisions, or refusing to accept their oath of office unless they've recited it standing up.

The YouTube video of the council meeting went viral on the Slovak internet. The story was covered in major Slovak media outlets, and started a discussion about the political culture in the country. The incident spawned a number of jokes and memes. Slovak Lines, a company operating bus transport, even offered a special trip to Fekišovce for the next municipal council meeting. The offer was posted on the company's Facebook page, and encouraged people to sign up for the trip.

Genealogical resources
The records for genealogical research are available at the state archive "Štátny archív in Prešov, Slovakia"
 Greek Catholic church records (births/marriages/deaths): 1805–1937 (parish B)

See also
 List of municipalities and towns in Slovakia

References

External links
 http://en.e-obce.sk/obec/fekisovce/fekisovce.html
 https://web.archive.org/web/20070513023228/http://www.statistics.sk/mosmis/eng/run.html
 http://www.fekisovce.sk
 Surnames of living people in Fekišovce

Villages and municipalities in Sobrance District